In Pine Effect is the third studio album by English electronic music producer Mike Paradinas under the stage name µ-Ziq. It was released on 31 October 1995 by Hi-Rise Recordings in the United Kingdom, and later by Astralwerks in the United States.

Track listing

References

External links
 

Mike Paradinas albums
1995 albums
Astralwerks albums